Jewish Palestinian Aramaic or Jewish Western Aramaic was a Western Aramaic language spoken by the Jews during the Classic Era in Judea and the Levant, specifically in Hasmonean, Herodian and Roman Judea and adjacent lands in the late first millennium BCE, and later in Syria Palaestina and Palaestina Secunda in the early first millennium CE. This language is sometimes called Galilean Aramaic, although that term more specifically refers to its Galilean dialect.

The most notable text in the Jewish Western Aramaic corpus is the Jerusalem Talmud, which is still studied in Jewish religious schools and academically, although not as widely as the Babylonian Talmud, most of which is written in Jewish Babylonian Aramaic. There are some older texts in Jewish Western Aramaic, notably the Megillat Taanit: the Babylonian Talmud contains occasional quotations from these. Dead Sea Scroll 4Q246, found in Qumran, is written in this language as well. Many extant manuscripts in Jewish Western Aramaic have been corrupted over the years of their transmission by Eastern Aramaic-speaking scribes freely correcting "errors" they came across, these "errors" actually being genuine Jewish Western Aramaic features. To date, all formal grammars of the dialect fall victim to these corruptions, and there is still no published syntax.

There were some differences in dialect between Judea and Galilee, and most surviving texts are in the Galilean dialect. Michael Sokoloff has published separate dictionaries of the two dialects. A Galilean dialect of Aramaic was probably the language spoken by Jesus.

Jewish Western Aramaic was gradually replaced by Arabic following the Muslim conquest of the Levant in the 7th century.

See also
 Christian Palestinian Aramaic
 Jewish Babylonian Aramaic
 Mandaic language
 Samaritan Aramaic language
 Western Neo-Aramaic

References

Sources

 
 
 
 
 
 
 
 

Extinct languages of Asia
Jews and Judaism in Palestine (region)
Jews and Judaism in the Roman Empire
Judeo-Aramaic languages
Sacred languages
Talmud
Western Aramaic languages